Clubul Sportiv Municipal Râmnicu Sărat, commonly known as CSM Râmnicu Sărat or Râmnicu Sărat, is a Romanian professional football club from Râmnicu Sărat, Buzău County, Romania, founded in 1966.

They currently play in the Liga III, although in the 2012–2013 season, had finished 4th in the 2012–13 Liga III season. The relegation was due to financial reasons.

Honours
Liga III
Winners (4): 1975–76, 1982–83, 1988–89, 2008–09
Runners-up (2): 2005–06, 2015–16
Liga IV – Buzău County
Winners (5): 1969–70, 1994–95, 1996–97, 2014–15, 2019–20

Players

First-team squad

Out on loan

Club Officials

Board of directors

Current technical staff

League history

External links
 
 

Association football clubs established in 1966
Football clubs in Buzău County
Liga II clubs
Liga III clubs
Liga IV clubs
1966 establishments in Romania
Râmnicu Sărat